Arab cuisine is the cuisine of the Arabs, defined as the various regional cuisines spanning the Arab world, from the Maghreb to the Fertile Crescent and the Arabian Peninsula. These cuisines are centuries old and reflect the culture of trading in baharat (spices), herbs, and foods. The regions have many similarities, but also unique traditions. They have also been influenced by climate, cultivation, and mutual commerce.

Medieval cuisine

Breads
The white bread  was made with high-quality wheat flour, similar to  bread but thicker, the fermented dough was leavened usually with yeast and "baker's borax" and baked in a tandoor. One poetic verse describing this bread:
"In the farthest end of Karkh of Baghdad, a baker I saw offering bread, wondrous fair.
From purest essence of wheat contrived. Radiant and absolute, you may see your image reflected, crystal clear.
 rounds glowing with lovely whiteness, more playful than gorgeous singing girls,
They look like crystal trays, and were they indeed so, they would have served us as plates.

Sauces
Numerous recipes for sauces have survived from historic Arabic cookbooks. The 10th-century  written by Ibn Sayyar al-Warraq gives several recipes to be served with roasted fish, attributed to the various sources.

To Ibrahim ibn al-Mahdi are credited two  recipes, one prepared by adding rue, caraway, thyme, asafetida and cassia to the mustard sauce, and another made by mashing vinegar-soaked raisins with garlic, walnut, mustard, vinegar, and seasonings like asafetida and anise.

From the seventh Abbasid caliph Al-Ma'mun's recipe collection comes a  made with whey, walnut, garlic, olive oil and murri.

There are similar recipes meant for poultry dishes prepared with seasonings like ginger, pomegranate, spikenard, and cloves.

Walnut and garlic with yogurt whey are the most you may need for it.
Or make it with vinegar, and coriander. But with  it will be even better.
Or with just vinegar and onion eat your fish and it will still be a tasty dish.

Sweets

Described as the "food of kings" and "supreme judge of all sweets", lauzinaj was an almond-based confection that had entered medieval European cuisine by the 13th-century from Andalusian influence, returning Crusaders and Latin translations of cookery books. There are two versions of the dish known from medieval texts:
 or "drenched ", this dish is believed to be an earlier version of the Ottoman dish baklava. It was made by filling thin pastry dough with a mixture of ground almond (and sometimes other nuts like pistachio or walnut), rose water, and sometimes luxury flavorings like mastic, ambergris, or musk. 
 was made with ground almonds cooked in boiling honey or sugar until reaching a taffy-like consistency. The raw version, closer to marzipan in consistency, was made by blending the almonds with sugar and flavoring with camphor, musk, and rose water. The finished confection was molded into animal or other shapes, or cut into squares and triangles.

Vegetables
Vegetables include leeks, endive, melilot, fenugreek, onions, purslane, Jew's mallow and radish. Boiled asparagus is served with olive oil and murri. The cooking water may be sweetened with honey and seasoned with cilantro, rue, anise and black pepper, and used as a beverage either by itself with honey, or added to wine.

Some vegetable dishes are served cold. One example of such a dish is eggplant with fried onion, fresh herbs and olive oil dressed with fermented sauces, vinegar and caraway. There are several cold eggplant dishes that are similar, some made with smoked eggplant, adding nuts like ground walnuts or almonds, and sometimes different seasonings like saffron, cassia, and galangal.

A dish for fried carrots with fresh herbs, dressing and spices was described by the poet Kushajim:

Dinars of carnelian and gold in a vessel so delicate, it may almost melt and flow.
All radiating with luster like carnelian shimmering on pearls.
In the vessel harmoniously combined, here together and there disperse.
The spices emitting fragrance like wine mingled with sweet breeze.
On top are pearls and silver decked with gems,
Which the cook delicately fashioned, a gorgeous dish with flavor and perfume.
The scattered rue is flowers of turquoise gems, vibrantly green,
Jiggling with murri and olive oil, ebbing and flowing with sheen.

Diet and foods

Arab cuisine uses specific and unique foods and spices. Some of those foods are:
 Meat—lamb and chicken are the most used, followed by beef and goat. Other poultry is used in some regions, and fish is used in coastal areas including the Mediterranean Sea, Atlantic Ocean and the Red Sea. Some Christian Arabs eat pork.
 Dairy products—widely used, especially yogurt, buttermilk and white cheese. Butter and cream are also used extensively.
 Herbs and spices—amounts and types used generally varies from region to region.

Herbs and spices include: sesame, saffron, black pepper, allspice, turmeric, garlic, cumin, cinnamon, parsley, coriander and sumac.

Spice mixtures include baharat, ras el hanout, za'atar, and harissa.
 Beverages—hot beverages are served more often than cold, coffee being at the top of the list in Middle-Eastern countries and tea at top in Maghreb countries.

In Jordan, Palestine, Egypt, some parts of Syria, Morocco, and Algeria, tea is much more prevalent as a beverage. Other Arabic drinks include Andalucian horchata and Maghrebi avocado smoothie.
 Grains—rice is the staple and is used for most dishes; wheat is the main source for bread. Bulgur and semolina are also used extensively.

According to historic recipes known from Arabic cookbooks, grains were primarily used to make porridge and pasta type dishes in Arab cuisine until the 12th century.

By the 13th century, the Turkic style  and  noodles had entered the cuisine.
 Legumes—lentils are widely used in all colours, as well as fava beans, peanuts, chickpeas (garbanzo beans), scarlet runner beans, green peas, lupini beans, white beans, and brown beans.
 Vegetables—popular vegetables in Arab cuisine include carrots, eggplant (aubergine), zucchini (courgette), artichokes, okra, onions, and olives. Potatoes are also eaten as vegetables in Arab culture.
 Fruits—pomegranate, dates, figs, oranges, citruses, watermelons, cantaloupe, honeydew melon, grapes, peaches, and nectarines are favored in Arab cuisine.
 Nuts—almonds, pine nuts, pistachios, and walnuts are often included in dishes or eaten as snacks.
 Greens—parsley, coriander and mint are popular as seasonings in many dishes, while spinach and mulukhiyah (leaves from the plant of the Corchorus genus) are used in cooked dishes.
 Dressings and sauces—the most popular dressings include various combinations of olive oil, lemon juice, parsley, or garlic, as well as tahini (sesame paste). Labaneh (strained yogurt) is often seasoned with mint, onion, or garlic, and served as a sauce with various dishes.

Structure of meals
There are two basic structures for meals in the Arab World, one regular schedule during most of the year and a second one that is unique to the month of Ramadan in which observant Muslims fast during the day.

Year-round

Breakfast
Cafés often serve croissants for breakfast. Breakfast is often a quick meal, consisting of bread and dairy products, with tea and sometimes jam. The most common breakfast items are labneh and cream (made of cow's milk).

Lunch

Lunch is considered the main meal of the day, and is traditionally eaten between 1:30 pm and 2:30 pm. It is the meal for which the family comes together. Rarely do meals have different courses; however, salads and mezze are served as side dishes to the main meal.

The vegetables and meat are usually cooked together in a sauce (often tomato, although others are also popular) to make , which is served with rice. Most households add bread.

Drinks are not necessarily served with the food; however, there is a very wide variety of drinks such as shineena (or ), Naqe'e Al Zabib, and fruit juice, as well as other traditional Arabic drinks.

During the 20th century, carbonated soda and fruit-based drinks have also become very popular.

Dinner
Dinner is traditionally the lightest meal, although in modern times, dinner has become more important with regards to entertaining guests due to the hours of the workday.

Ramadan

Iftar
Iftar (also called ), or fast-breaking, is the meal taken at dusk when the fast is over. The meal consists of three courses: first, diners eat a date due to Islamic tradition.

This is followed by a soup or anything they would like, the most popular being lentil soup, but a wide variety of soups such as chicken, oats, freeka (a soup made from whole wheat and chicken broth), potato, and others are also offered.

The third course is the main dish, usually eaten after an interval, when Maghreb prayer is conducted. The main dish is mostly similar to what is served in lunch year-round, except that cold drinks are served.

Suhur
Suhur is the meal eaten just before dawn, when fasting must begin. It is eaten to help the person make it through the day with enough energy until dusk.

Sweets

In addition to the two meals eaten during Ramadan (one for dinner and one for Suhur before dawn), sweets are consumed much more than usual during the month of Ramadan; sweets and fresh fruits are served between these two meals. Although most sweets are made all year-round such as kanafeh, baklava, and basbousa, some are made especially for Ramadan, such as qatayef.

Arab hospitality

Essential to any cooking in the Arab world is the concept of hospitality and generosity. Meals are generally large family affairs, with much sharing and a great deal of warmth over the dinner table. Formal dinners and celebrations generally involve large quantities of lamb, and every occasion entails large quantities of Arabic coffee or Arabic tea.

Khaleej

Coffee ceremony
In the Khaleej al-Arab region, a visitor is greeted by a great table of dried fruits, fresh fruits, nuts and cakes with syrup. Dried fruits include figs, dates, apricots and plums. Fresh fruits include citruses, melons and pomegranate. Arabic coffee is most favored, but Arabic tea is also a great refresher. Spices are often added to the coffee and other drinks.

Guests dinner 
In the Khaleej al-Arab region, a guest should expect a dinner consisting of a very large platter, shared commonly, with a large amount of spiced rice, with spicy lamb, chicken, or both, as separate dishes, with various stewed vegetables, heavily spiced, sometimes with a tomato-based sauce.

Different types of bread are served with toppings specific to the region. Tea would certainly accompany the meal, as it is almost constantly consumed. Coffee would also be served.

Maghreb

Tea/coffee ceremony
In the Maghreb region, a visitor will find a table full of bread-like snacks, including m’semen, baghrir, and other stuffed breads. These are served with honey, rosewater or olive oil.

There are also many different cookies and cakes included accompanied by plates with different kinds of nuts. Mint tea is often served with it in a traditional Maghrebian teapot.

Dinner guests
In the Maghreb region, a guest may find a table with different kinds of stews, called  or tajines. Dishes such as couscous and other semolina-based foods are also to be found.

These main dishes are accompanied by smaller mezze-like plates with salads, sauces and dips.

Levantine

Coffee/tea ceremony
In an average Arab Levantine household, a visitor might expect a table full of mezzes, breads topped with spices including za'atar and nuts. In the Levant, Arabic coffee is a much-loved beverage, but Arabic tea is also much enjoyed in Jordan and Palestine.

Dinner guests
In the Levant, a guest will find a table with different kinds of mezzes, nuts, dips and oils.  include hummus, baba ghanoush, falafel, kibbeh, kafta, smoked vegetables and tabouli salads. The nuts can differ from almonds to walnuts, with different spice coatings. The dips and oils include hummus and olive oil.

Regional differences

There are many regional differences in the Arab cuisine. Some dishes, such as mansaf (the national dish of Jordan), are native to certain countries and rarely, if ever, make an appearance in other countries. 

Unlike most Western recipes, cinnamon is used in meat dishes, as well as in sweets such as baklava. Dishes such as tajine and couscous can differ from Morocco to Libya, each having their own unique preparation. Other dishes, such as the Andalucian-Moorish bastilla and albondigas have different traditional spice mixes and fillings.

Many Arabic food words are borrowed from Aramaic, the language spoken by the Christian Nabataean inhabitants of Iraq and Syria.

Regional Arab cuisines

Arabian Peninsula

Eastern Arabian cuisine today is the result of a combination of diverse influences, incorporating Levantine and Yemeni cuisines.

Bukhari rice is a very popular dish eaten in the Hejaz district of Saudi Arabia. It is made with spicy tomato sauce, flavoured chicken and a fresh salad.

It is made of rice (typically basmati), meat, vegetables, and a mixture of spices. The meats used are usually chicken, goat, lamb, camel, beef, fish or shrimp.  is popular in countries around the Persian Gulf and the Khuzestan Province of Iran.

The cuisine of Yemen is in some ways distinct from other Arab cuisines. As in most Arab countries, chicken, goat, and lamb are eaten more often than beef, and fish is eaten mostly in coastal areas.

However, cheese, butter, and other dairy products are less common, especially in the cities and other urban areas. As with other Arab cuisines, the most widespread beverages are tea and coffee; tea is usually flavored with cardamom, clove, or mint, and coffee with cardamom.

Although each region has their own variation, saltah is considered the national dish of Yemen.

It is eaten with flat bread known as mulawah, which serves as a utensil to scoop up the food.

Other dishes widely known in Yemen include aseed, fahsa, thareed, mandi, fattah, shakshouka, shafut, bint al-sahn, kabsa, jachnun, harees and Hyderabadi haleem.

Mashriq

Levantine cuisine is the traditional cuisine of the Fertile Crescent. Although now divided into Syria, Lebanon, Jordan, Iraq, Egypt, and Palestine, the region has historically been more united, and shares many culinary traditions. Although very similar, there is some variation within the Levantine area.

Dishes include olive oil, za'atar, and garlic, and common dishes include a wide array of mezze or bread dips, stuffings, and side dishes such as hummus, falafel, ful, tabouleh, labaneh, and baba ghanoush.

It also includes copious amounts of garlic and olive oil, often seasoned with lemon juice—almost no meal goes by without including these ingredients. Most often foods are either grilled, baked, fried, or sautéed in olive oil; butter and cream are rarely used, other than in a few desserts.

Vegetables are often eaten raw or pickled, as well as cooked. While the cuisine does not boast a multitude of sauces, it focuses on herbs, spices, and the freshness of ingredients.

Bedouin cuisine
The Bedouins of the Arabian Peninsula, Middle East and North Africa rely on a diet of dates, dried fruit, nuts, wheat, barley, rice, and meat. The meat comes from large animals such as cows, sheep, and lambs. They also eat dairy products: milk, cheese, yoghurt, and buttermilk (labneh).

Bedouins also use many different dried beans including white beans, lentils, and chickpeas. Vegetables that are commonly used are those that could be dried, such as pumpkins, but also vegetables that are more heat-resistant, such as aubergines.

They drink a lot of fresh verbena tea, Arabic tea, Maghrebi mint tea, or Arabic coffee. A daily break to freshen up with drinks is a much-loved tradition.

Breakfast consists of baked beans, bread, nuts, dried fruits, milk, yoghurt, and cheese with tea or coffee. Snacks also include nuts and dried fruits.

Levant

In Palestine and Jordan, the population has a cooking style of their own, involved in roasting various meats, baking flatbreads, and cooking thick yogurt-like pastes from goat's milk.

Musakhan is a common main dish, famous in northern Jordan, the city of Jerusalem, and northern West Bank. The main component is taboon bread, which is topped with pieces of cooked sweet onions, sumac, saffron, and allspice. For large dinners, it can be topped by one or two roasted chickens on a single large  bread.

The primary cheese of the Palestinian  is Ackawi cheese, which is a semi-hard cheese with a mild, salty taste and sparsely filled with roasted sesame seeds. It is primarily used in kenafah.

Maqluba is another popular meal in Jordan and central Palestine. Mujaddara, another food of the West Bank, as well as in the Levant in general, consists of cooked green lentils, with bulghur sauteed in olive oil.

Mansaf is a traditional meal, and the national dish of Jordan, having roots in the Bedouin population of the country. It is mostly cooked on special occasions such as Ramadan, Eid ul-Fitr, a birth, or a large dinner gathering.

 is a leg of lamb or large pieces of mutton, on top of a markook bread that has been topped with yellow rice. A type of thick dried yogurt made from goat's milk, called jameed, is poured on top of the lamb and rice to give it its distinct flavor and taste. The dish is garnished with cooked pine nuts and almonds.

 is a famous Syrian soup, alongside many soups made of lentils. Lebanese food also has a wide range of dips including hummus, baba ganoush, and labneh, and offers many raw-meat dishes.

Syrian food can be either extremely vegetarian or a meat lover's paradise. Lemon, oregano, za'atar, paprika, and various other Mediterranean spices and herbs are used in Syrian cuisine.

Levantine cuisine also incorporates wines made in Lebanon, Syria, Jordan and Palestine and the Levantine equivalent of the Greek ouzo, known as arak.

Iraq/Mesopotamia

Iraq is home to the first cookbook ever recorded in history, historically in Baghdad and Mesopotamia. The Kitab al-tabikh is the oldest surviving Arabic cookbook, written by al-Warraq in the 10th century. It is compiled from the recipes of the 8th and 9th century courts of the Abbasid Caliphate in Baghdad. Due to its location, Iraq shares similarities in cooking and cuisines between both the surrounding regions of the Arab world as well as Turkish and Persian cuisine. Iraqi cuisine mainly consists of meat, rather than appetizers. In Iraqi cuisine, the most common meats are chicken and lamb. The national dish of Iraq is the Masgouf fish, usually enjoyed with grilled tomatoes and onions.
Iraqi cuisine uses more spices than most Arab cuisines. Iraq's main food crops include wheat, barley, rice, vegetables, and dates. Vegetables include eggplant, okra, potatoes, and tomatoes. Pulses such as chickpeas and lentils are also quite common. Common meats in Iraqi cuisine are lamb and beef; fish and poultry are also used.

Soups and stews are often prepared and served with rice and vegetables. Biryani, although influenced by Indian cuisine, is milder with a different mixture of spices, and a wider variety of vegetables, including potatoes, peas, carrots, and onions. Dolma is also one of the most popular dishes.

The Iraqi cuisine is famous for its extremely tender kebab, as well as its tikka. A wide variety of spices, pickles, and amba are also extensively used.

Egypt

Egypt has a very rich cuisine with many unique customs. These customs also vary within Egypt itself, for example, in the coastal areas, like the coast of the Mediterranean Sea and Canal, the diet relies heavily on fish. In the more rural areas, reliance on farm products is much heavier. Duck, geese, chicken, and river fish are the main animal protein sources. While Egyptians eat a lot of meat, Egyptian cuisine is rich in vegetarian dishes; three national dishes of Egypt; ful medames,  (also known in other countries as falafel), and kushari, are generally vegetarian. Fruits are also greatly appreciated in Egypt: mangos, grapes, bananas, apples, sycamore, guavas, and peaches are very popular, especially because they are all domestically produced and are available at relatively low prices. A famous dessert from Egypt is called , which is similar to a bread and butter pudding made traditionally with puff pastry, milk and nuts. It is served all across the Middle East and is also made on special occasions such as Eid.

Africa

Sudan

In comparison to its Maghreb and Levantine neighbors, the cuisine of Sudan tends to be generous with spices. Sudanese cuisine has a rich variety in ingredients and creativity. Simple everyday vegetables are used to create stews and omelettes that are healthy yet nutritious, and full of energy and flair. These stews are called . One could have a zucchini , spinach , etc. Popular dishes include ful medames, shahan ful, hummus, bamya (a stew made from ground, sun-dried okra), and gurasa (pancake), as well as different types of salads and sweets.

Maghreb

Maghreb cuisine is the cooking of the Maghreb region, the northwesternmost part of the Arab world along the Mediterranean Sea, consisting of the countries of Algeria, Libya, Morocco, Tunisia, and Mauritania. In Maghrebi cuisine, the most common staple foods are wheat (for khobz bread and couscous), fish, seafood, goat, lamb, beef, dates, almonds, olives and various vegetables and fruits. 
 
Moroccan cuisine has long been considered one of the most diverse in the world. This is because Morocco has interacted extensively with the outside world for centuries. Over the centuries, chefs in Moroccan cuisine in Fes, Meknes, Marrakech, Rabat and Tetouan have been the basis for what is known as Moroccan cuisine today. Moroccan cuisine also ranked first in the Arab world and Africa, and second in the world in 2012 after France.

Tunisian cuisine is the style of cooking used by the Tunisian people and is part of the Maghreb and Mediterranean cuisine.  on mush, spices, olive oil, chili red pepper, wheat flour, lamb, garlic, fish and many other vegetables and spices are common. Tunisian cuisine offers what is known as a "solar kitchen" that relies heavily on olive oil, spices, tomatoes, fish species, and meat. Bread is an essential ingredient in Tunisian cuisine, as it accompanies almost all dishes and is usually used by dipping for broth.

Libyan cuisine derives much from the traditions of Maghreb and Mediterranean cuisines. Pork consumption is forbidden, in accordance with Sharia, the religious laws of Islam. Tripoli is Libya's capital, and the cuisine is particularly influenced by Italian cuisine. Pasta is common, and many seafood dishes are available. Southern Libyan cuisine is more traditionally Arab and Berber. Common fruits and vegetables include figs, dates, oranges, apricots and olives.

Libyan cooking, like Tunisian, includes hot spices. It can be made with any type of pasta, and the simplest dish involves frying onions in oil, throwing in the tomato puree, chili powder, turmeric, then adding water and salt and leaving to boil before adding the pasta. Another way involves adding lamb chops, chickpeas and garlic to the sauce before serving hot with a sprinkle of extra virgin olive oil, lemon, fresh chili and optional crusty bread. Other vegetables such as pumpkin, potato and green pepper can be added. Maglouba, shakshouka, usban,  and asida. Desserts and beverages include makroudh, Libyan tea, ghoriba,  and mhalbiya.

Algerian cuisine is characterized by a wealth derived from land and sea production, a Mediterranean-Maghreb cuisine. It offers a variety of dishes depending on the region and season, which gives a very varied plate. This cuisine is still based on vegetables and cereals that have always been produced in abundance in the country, which was formerly called Roma bakery and then Bakery Europe. In addition, Algeria's rich history has contributed to the abundance of food from different periods and regions of the world. Among all the culinary specialties available in Algeria, couscous remains the most famous, recognized as a national dish, as well as the traditional pastry called Oriental pastry in Western countries. Despite its historical transmission from generation to generation, there are many books devoted to Algerian cuisine. Algerian cuisine combines a variety of ingredients including vegetables, fruits, spices, meat, fish, seafood, vegetables and dried fruits. Vegetables are often used for salads, soups, casserole, couscous and sauces. Carrots, pumpkins, potatoes, green beans, beans, kale, eggplant, and truffles are widely used.

Gallery

See also
 List of Arab salads

References

External links

 
Arab culture

Cuisine by ethnicity
Middle Eastern cuisine
Mediterranean cuisine
North African cuisine